Siedliska  is a village in the administrative district of Gmina Piaseczno, within Piaseczno County, Masovian Voivodeship, in east-central Poland.

References

Siedliska